John Ballinger may refer to:

John Ballinger (librarian) (1860–1933), Welsh librarian
John Ballinger (musician), American musician